Berlinia occidentalis is a species of plant in the family Fabaceae. It is found in Ivory Coast, Ghana, Liberia, and Sierra Leone. A medium-sized tree very similar to Berlinia bracteosa, its wood is used in construction and furniture.

References

Detarioideae
Flora of West Tropical Africa
Vulnerable plants
Taxonomy articles created by Polbot
Taxa named by Ronald William John Keay